The Great Well is a 1924 British silent drama film directed by Henry Kolker and starring Thurston Hall, Seena Owen and Lawford Davidson. It was based on the 1923 play The Great Well by Alfred Sutro.

Cast
 Thurston Hall - Peter Starling
 Seena Owen - Camilla Challenor
 Lawford Davidson - Major Dereth
 Joan Morgan - Annette
 Eva Moore - Mrs. Starling
 Cameron Carr - John
 Harvey Braban - Eric
 Simeon Stuart - Sir Wilmot
 Hugh Dempster - Dick

References

External links
 

1924 films
British drama films
British silent feature films
Films directed by Henry Kolker
1924 drama films
British films based on plays
Ideal Film Company films
British black-and-white films
1920s English-language films
1920s British films
Silent drama films